Greatest Hits Live (Rip It to Shreds) is a live album by the original members of The Animals. It was released in 1984.

Background
The album documents the 1983 concert tour that accompanied the second, and last, reunion attempt of the original group.

While approximately two-thirds of the tour's shows were taken from Ark, the 1983 reunion album, and one-third were drawn from the line-up's original 1960s recordings, Greatest Hits Live focuses almost exclusively on the older material.

Track listing
 "It's Too Late" (Eric Burdon. John Steriling)
 "House of the Rising Sun" (Traditional, arr. Alan Price)
 "It's My Life" (Roger Atkins, Carl D'Errico)
 "Don't Bring Me Down" (Gerry Goffin, Carole King)
 "Don't Let Me Be Misunderstood" (Bennie Benjamin, Sol Marcus, Gloria Caldwell)
 "I'm Crying" (Alan Price, Eric Burdon)
 "Bring It On Home to Me" (Sam Cooke)
 "O Lucky Man!" (Alan Price)
 "Boom Boom" (John Lee Hooker)
 "We've Gotta Get out of This Place" (Barry Mann, Cynthia Weil)
 "When I Was Young" (Eric Burdon, Vic Briggs, John Weider, Barry Jenkins, Danny McCulloch)

Personnel

The Animals
 Eric Burdon – vocals
 Hilton Valentine –  guitar
 Alan Price – keyboards, background vocals
 Chas Chandler –  bass, background vocals
 John Steel – drums

Additional personnel
 Zoot Money – keyboards
 Steve Grant – guitar, synthesizer, background vocals
 Steve Gregory – tenor saxophone, baritone saxophone
 Nippy Noya – percussion

References

1984 live albums
The Animals albums
I.R.S. Records albums